David Groves, better known by his birth name Patrick David Mackay (born 25 September 1952), is a British serial killer who is believed to be one of the United Kingdom's most prolific serial murderers. He confessed to murdering thirteen people across London, Essex and Kent in England between 1973 and 1975. After retracting his confessions to nine of the killings, he was convicted of three counts of manslaughter; two additional cases were left to lie on file and police later found proof that he had killed one of these two victims. All of his confessions were found to match existing unsolved murders in and around London, and no one else has ever been arrested, charged or convicted for these officially still-unsolved crimes. He also attempted to kill a boy as a child.

Officially diagnosed as a psychopath at the age of fifteen, Mackay has been repeatedly denied parole since 1995 on the basis that he is considered too dangerous for release, although in recent years has been incarcerated in open prison conditions with day release provisions. In 2020, authorities launched fresh inquiries into his suspected murders, but they were unable to find sufficient evidence. Dartford MP Gareth Johnson has repeatedly voiced his concerns over Mackay's potential release. In July 2022, it was revealed that Mackay's case had been referred to the Parole Board again.

Early life
Mackay was born at Park Royal Hospital, now known as Central Middlesex Hospital in London. He grew up with his parents and sisters in Dartford, Kent. His parents were Harold Mackay, a Scottish accountant, and Marion Mackay, a woman of creole descent from Guyana. His two sisters were born later in 1954 and 1957.

As a child, Mackay was a frequent victim of physical abuse at the hands of his father. Mackay would perform poorly on his academic grades, bully his younger classmates and frequently have tantrums. A classmate would later describe Mackay as "like a little terrorist" who physically attacked other pupils. He also engaged in cruelty to animals and often tore the wings off birds. 

When Mackay was ten years old, Harold (his father) died from a heart attack on his way to work – the result of complications of alcoholism and a weak heart. His last words to his son were, "Remember to be good". Mackay was supposedly unable to come to terms with the loss of his father, telling people Harold was still alive and keeping a photograph of him on his person. He did not go to the funeral in Scotland based on his mother's recommendation. 

Later, he assumed the role of 'father figure' within the family, beating his mother and sisters. Mackay's mother eventually moved the family to Gravesend from Dartford, but family life did not improve and the police were called to the home as frequently as four times a week. He was prone to extreme tantrums and fits of anger, beating his mother and sister. He also attempted to kill a boy younger than himself, and later said he would have succeeded had he not been restrained. At 15, Mackay was diagnosed as a psychopath by a psychiatrist, Dr Leonard Carr, who predicted he would grow up to become a "cold, psychopathic killer." He was removed from his family home on eighteen occasions between the ages of 12 and 22 and put into various specialist schools, institutions and prisons. One of his teachers at a specialist school described him as "a potential murderer of women". In October 1968, Mackay was committed to Moss Side Hospital, Liverpool, as a diagnosed psychopath. He was released in 1972.

Crimes in adulthood
As he entered adulthood, Mackay developed a fascination with Nazism, calling himself "Franklin Bollvolt the First" and filling his flat with Nazi memorabilia. He lived in London and frequently abused drugs and alcohol.

London theft and murder spree
Following Mackay's release in 1972, the affluent London areas of Chelsea and Knightsbridge were engulfed by a wave of petty crimes. Known for being home to the wealthiest London residents and full of luxury shops and high-end restaurants, the areas suddenly saw a massive, unexplained rise in muggings, robberies and handbag snatchings. The attacks specifically targeted elderly ladies, and the unidentified attacker would befriend these women and gain access to their homes before committing their crimes. It would later be found that Mackay was behind these crimes.

On 14 February 1974, 84-year-old Isabella Griffith was physically assaulted, strangled and stabbed in her home in Chelsea by Mackay. Police were unable to identify him as the perpetrator and the muggings and petty thefts continued in the area. Thirteen months later, on 10 March 1975, elderly Adele Price was also killed in her Chelsea home by Mackay who had entered her property asking for a glass of water. Her granddaughter was coming home at the time and, without knowing, passed the killer as he left the premises after attacking the woman. Police were concerned the crime spree and the killings of the two women were linked.

Killing of Father Crean
Some miles away on 21 March 1975, priest Father Anthony Crean was brutally killed in his home in Shorne, Kent, near to the home of Mackay's mother. Crean had been attacked with an axe in a frenzied attack, with the weapon being found at the scene. Mackay had been seen in the area by multiple witnesses.

An investigating police officer remembered an incident that had occurred some months earlier involving the young Mackay, who had befriended the priest only to break into his home and steal a cheque for £30. Although Crean tried to persuade the police not to do so, Mackay was arrested and prosecuted at the time. He was subsequently ordered to pay compensation but never did. The incident caused a rift between Mackay and Crean, and the former had returned to London. After the incident was recalled by the officer, police arrested Mackay, who quickly admitted to killing Crean.

Links to previous crimes discovered
After his arrest for the murder of Father Crean, Mackay's fingerprints were taken, which were found to match those found at the scene of Adele Price's death. Jewellery and silver fountain pens were found in Mackay's home which had come from robberies he had committed in the Chelsea and Belgravia areas. Mackay took detectives to an area of Clapham where he said he had thrown a knife he used in his killings. The Metropolitan Police began to investigate Mackay and he was found to have committed many other of the unsolved murders and crimes in the London area.

Confessions

Having willingly confessed to Crean's murder, Mackay then unexpectedly confessed to a series of unsolved murders, 13 in total. Most of these murders were unknown to the interviewing officers, but investigators checked his descriptions of the killings and found they indeed matched details of unsolved murders that had occurred in and around London.

Mackay stated in interviews that his first murder had been of 17-year-old German au pair Heidi Mnilk, who was murdered on 9 July 1973. Mackay had stabbed her on a train before opening the door and throwing her out near Catford. He further stated that he had killed a drunken homeless man by throwing him off a bridge into the Thames in January 1974. Mackay also confessed to the murders of 57-year-old Stephanie Britton and her 4-year-old grandson Christopher Martin on 12 January 1974, saying he had only killed the child as he had been a witness. He confessed also to the murder of Frank Goodman on 13 June 1974, who had been kicked to death over a pack of cigarettes. He went on to confess to the murder of 92-year-old Sarah Rodmell in her flat in Hackney on 23 December 1974, saying that he had nailed the back door shut and put her stockings in her mouth, and that "killing her was as easy as washing my socks". He also confessed to the murder of 48-year old Café owner Ivy Davies in Southend in February 1975, saying he killed her by beating her with a tent peg. This was accurate as she had been found to have been beaten to death with some sort of metal bar, and Mackay admitted that he knew of Davies and considered robbing her. He was also then heard bragging about Davies's murder while on remand in Brixton Prison. The three other murders he confessed to were the 1973 murder of Mary Hynes in Kentish Town and the murders of Isabella Griffith and Adele Price in 1974 and 1975 respectively.

Investigators concluded that Mackay had been the perpetrator of the mugging and theft spree in Chelsea and Kensington, crimes which were previously unsolved.

Mackay later retracted his confessions to all but four of the murders (Griffith, Price, Crean and the homeless man he said he had thrown from a bridge in January 1974). This meant that there was insufficient evidence to charge him for more than five murders. Police were unable to identify the homeless victim Mackay said he had killed in January 1974.

Trial
At his trial in November 1975, Mackay was convicted of the manslaughter of Adele Price, Isabella Griffith and Father Anthony Crean after pleading guilty on the grounds of diminished responsibility. Due to insufficient evidence he was not convicted of the murders of Goodman or Hynes, but the cases were left to lie on file. Police later found evidence which proved he had killed Frank Goodman. He was sentenced to life imprisonment with a minimum term of 20 years. 

Mackay's defence team had pleaded insanity, but medical experts instead concluded that he was a psychopath (a personality disorder and not a mental disorder).

Subsequent developments
In 1989, he appeared briefly in a BBC documentary Forty Minutes episode titled "Danger Men" aired in February 1990. Mackay spent time in Hull Prison, where a special unit was set up to deal with one of the "most dangerous and difficult prisoners" in the country. As Mackay is asked if he considers himself a psychopath, he replies: "There is never any suggestion in my mind that I was ever a psychopath".

Mackay's minimum tariff was 20 years, meaning that he became eligible for release in 1995. He has been repeatedly denied full release by the parole board. In 2017 he was permitted to move to an open prison with day release provisions. In 2019 Dartford MP Gareth Johnson voiced concern at the potential release of Mackay, raising the issue in parliament and writing to the Secretary of State for Justice.

In June 2020 Mackay was again considered for release. The hearing of the Parole Board was postponed amidst a fresh investigation into Mackay's involvement in the murders to which he had previously confessed, and which he was still suspected of having committed (no one else has ever been arrested or charged for these murders). In May 2021 the Parole Board announced he would not be eligible for release but could remain in open prison conditions. 

In July 2022, it was revealed that Mackay's case had once again been referred to the Parole Board. The son of Ivy Davies said that he was outraged by the announcement but was unable to give an account to the Parole Board of the impact of Mackay's crimes as Mackay was not convicted of her murder. Commenting, he stated: "Everyone knows he did more. He hasn’t shown any remorse. But there's not a lot I can do about it."

Mackay has been imprisoned for 47 years as of 2022.

In popular culture

Documentaries
Mackay's crimes have featured in a number of documentaries:
In 2002, an ITV documentary titled London's Scariest Mysteries: Patrick Mackay documented his crimes.
On 7 October 2012, a series 2 episode of Fred Dineage's Murder Casebook series (alternatively titled Murders that Shook the Nation) covered Mackay's crimes. The episode was titled: Patrick Mackay: The Psychopath. 
On 20 August 2013, a series 5 episode of Born to Kill? documented Mackay's crimes. The episode was titled Patrick Mackay: The Devil's Disciple. 
On 1 January 2015, a series 1 episode of high-profile criminologist David Wilson's series First Kill/Last Kill focused on Mackay's crimes.

Books
In 1976 authors Tim Clark and John Penycate published a book on Mackay titled Psychopath: The Case of Patrick Mackay. It was published by Routledge.
In 2019 a book on Mackay's murders and alleged murders was released by author John Lucas, titled Britain's Forgotten Serial Killer: The Terror of the Axeman. The book contributed to the rising concerns of Mackay's possible release.

See also
List of serial killers in the United Kingdom
List of serial killers by number of victims
List of open prisons in the United Kingdom – MacKay has since 2017 been held in one of England's 12 open prisons
John Cannan – murderer and suspected killer of Suzy Lamplugh, also eligible for parole in 2022
Allan Grimson – another British killer suspected of killing dozens of victims who is now eligible for release
Jordan Worth – high-profile UK female criminal released from prison in 2022 (abuser of Alex Skeel)

References

Bibliography

External links
      2013 Born to Kill? documentary on Mackay
              2015 First Kill/Last Kill documentary on Mackay

1952 births
20th-century English criminals
British burglars
English people of Scottish descent
English people of Guyanese descent
Criminals from Kent
English people convicted of manslaughter
English prisoners sentenced to life imprisonment
English serial killers
People from Dartford
People with antisocial personality disorder
Prisoners sentenced to life imprisonment by England and Wales
Living people
Male serial killers